On Board is a 1998 Turkish drama film, written and directed by Serdar Akar. It won awards at film festivals in Ankara and Antalya, including the Golden Orange for Second Best Film. It was shot concurrently with A Madonna in Laleli, directed by Kudret Sabancı, and many of the main characters from the two films cross paths.

Synopsis
A dredging ship is anchored in Istanbul for food and supplies. But the sailor sent to get them is mugged by six people and one weeks' worth of wages are stolen from him. The captain leads his men into the city to find the people who did this. Upon meeting the men, they manage to get back the money and take back the woman in the group back to the ship.

Cast
Erkan Can as Captain İdris
Naci Taşdöğen as boxer
Yıldıray Şahinler as Ali
Haldun Boysan as Kamil
Ella Manea as the woman
Cengiz Küçükayvaz as doctor
İştar Gökseven as Makor
Güven Kıraç as Aziz
Funda Şirinkal
Bülent Çakırer

Reception

Reviews
Rekin Teksoy wrote that, The film showcased the director’s tendency to breakaway from familiar cinematographic idioms, and, The lives of four seaman were colourfully brought to the screen in all their vulgarity and violence, yet failed to be believable.

Awards
The film won the following awards:

International Critics' Week (Semaine de la Critique) Official Selection Cannes Film Festival 1999
35th Antalya Golden Orange Film Festival: Best Director (Serdar Akar) Second Best Film, Best Screenplay (Nevzat Dişiaçık), Best Actor (Erkan Can),
11th Ankara Film Festival:  Jury Special Prize (Serdar Akar), Best Actor (Erkan Can), Best Supporting Actor (Haldun Boysan), Most Promising New Director (Serdar Akar), Most Promising New Screenwriter (Serdar Akar)
10th Orhan Arıburnu Awards: Best Film, Best Director (Serdar Akar), Best Actor (Erkan Can)

References

External links
 
 TurkishFilmChannel page for the film

1998 films
1990s Turkish-language films
1998 drama films
Films set in Turkey
Films set in Istanbul
Turkish drama films